Sun Village is an unincorporated community and census-designated place (CDP) in Los Angeles County, California, United States. The center of Sun Village may be considered to be Palmdale Boulevard and 87th Street East as noted at the Los Angeles County Assessors office. As of the 2010 census the population of Sun Village was 11,565, up from 9,375 at the 2000 census.

Sun Village has been awarded federal, state, and county grants for the community based on this Avenue U boundary. There is a movement from the Sun Village Town Council to rebrand the area with the Sun Village name, which fell out of popularity in the early 1980s. New road signage erected around 2011 now labels Sun Village as a unique community. 
 
In 2007, the Sun Village and Littlerock town councils formed a Community Standard District together, and it was approved by the Los Angeles County Board of Supervisors.

On September 3, 2014, officials from Sun Village and the city of Palmdale gathered at the Palmdale City Council Chamber to sign a Memorandum of Understanding (MOU) in which Palmdale removed its sphere of influence from Sun Village.

Sun Village residents, as in many other Antelope Valley communities, take part in local pageants and parades. The community operates its own local chamber of commerce and town council.

Jackie Robinson County Park is a focal point in Sun Village. The Sun Village Women's Club donated the land to the county to build a park for the community. Jackie Robinson came to the park in person to dedicate it to the community. The Friends of Jackie Robinson Park have kept the dream alive by raising funds throughout the year and supporting programs and projects in the park. There are after-school programs, sports programs, homework help, music, marching and cheer leading.

Composer and musician Frank Zappa played his music in Sun Village and made many friends there in the beginning of his career. He pays homage to Sun Village in the song "Village of the Sun" from the 1974 album Roxy and Elsewhere.

Geography

Demographics
The 2010 United States Census reported that Sun Village had a population of 11,565. The racial makeup of Sun Village was 809 (7.0%) White (27.5% Non-Hispanic White), 6,806 (58.8%) African American, 167 (1.4%) Native American, 129 (1.1%) Asian, 24 (0.2%) Pacific Islander, 3,113 (26.9%) from other races, and 517 (4.5%) from two or more races. Hispanic or Latino of any race were 7,311 persons (63.2%).

The Census reported that out of 11,565 people, 11,565 (100%) lived in non-institutionalized group quarters, and 0 (0%) were institutionalized.

There were 1,502 households that (50.0%) had children under the age of 18 living in them, 1,788 (59.5%) were opposite-sex married couples living together, 391 (13.0%) had a female householder with no husband present, 251 (8.4%) had a male householder with no wife present.  There were 206 (6.9%) unmarried opposite-sex partnerships, and 20 (0.7%) same-sex married couples or partnerships. 406 households (13.5%) were made up of individuals, and 137 (4.6%) had someone living alone who was 65 years of age or older. The average household size was 8.85.  There were 2,430 families (80.9% of all households); the average family size was 12.18.

The population was spread out, with 3,583 people (31.0%) under the age of 18, 1,339 people (11.6%) aged 18 to 24, 2,715 people (23.5%) aged 25 to 44, 2,939 people (25.4%) aged 45 to 64, and 989 people (8.6%) who were 65 years of age or older.  The median age was 31.4 years. For every 100 females, there were 106.6 males.  For every 100 females age 18 and over, there were 86.0 males.

The homeowner vacancy rate was 2.9%; the rental vacancy rate was 5.4%.

References

External links

September 3, 2014 Palmdale, California Signs MOU with Sun Village, Ca
LATimes.Com – MAPPING L.A. > Antelope Valley > Sun Village
Wunderground Weather for Sun Village, CA

Census-designated places in Los Angeles County, California
Census-designated places in California